Charles Leonard Kimball (March 24, 1897 - September 25, 1976) was an American film editor and writer.

Active in Hollywood from 1932 on high-profile RKO Radio Pictures projects and a few short subjects, from 1934 onwards he worked almost exclusively on Mexican projects.  Kimball was active until 1964.  He was awarded the Mexican Ariel Award in 1951 for his editing work on In the Palm of Your Hand, and nominated for another the following year.

Selected filmography
 The Half-Naked Truth, 1932
 Thirteen Women, 1932
 State's Attorney, 1932
 La Zandunga, 1938 (Mexican production)
 From Nurse to Worse, 1940 (writer, Three Stooges short subject)
 Neither Blood Nor Sand (1941)
 The Count of Monte Cristo (1942)
 Doña Bárbara, 1943
 Nana, 1944
 The Escape (1944)
 La Otra, 1946
 The Torch, 1950
 Tehuantepec (1954)
 Comanche, 1956
 The Big Boodle, 1957

External links 
 

American film editors
Ariel Award winners
1897 births
1976 deaths
20th-century American screenwriters